Host system is any networked computer that provides services to other systems or users. These services may include but are not limited to printer, web or database access.

According to Kurose-Ross, Host system is another word for end system.

Host System is a computer on a network, which provides services to users or other computers on that network. Host System's usually run a multi-user operating system such as Unix, MVS or VMS, or at least an operating system with network services such as Windows NT, NetWare NDS or NetWare Bindery.

Computer networking

fr:Système hôte